Crescent Acres is a medium-sized neighbourhood that is located between Marquis Road, 15th Ave E., 15th St. E., 28th St. E., and Olive Diefenbaker Dr..  It extends to the city limits in the east.

According to 2001 statistics, Crescent Acres had a population 2,515.  That equals out to being 7.52% of the city's total population.  Also, Crescent Acres has 12.95% of its population which are of Aboriginal descent.  That equals out to 3.19% of the city's total Aboriginal population.

Government and politics
In municipal politics, Crescent Acres lies within Ward 6.  Blake Edwards is the councillor for this ward.

Provincially, Crescent Acres lies within the riding of Prince Albert Carlton.  Joe Hargrave is the MLA for the riding in which he has been serving since 2016.

Federally, Crescent Acres exists within the riding of Prince Albert.  Randy Hoback is the current MP of this riding in which he has been serving since 2008.

Education

École Vickers School - 2800 Bradbury Drive
St. Francis School - 1695 Olive Diefenbaker Dr.
Wee Care Preschool - 1510 Olive Diefenbaker Dr.

Recreation
Crescent Acres Park
Crescent Acres Community Club

Religion
Cornerstone Free Methodist Church - 2200 15th Ave E.
Crossroads Pentecostal Assembly - 1510 Olive Diefenbaker Dr.
Messiah Lutheran Church - 1796 15th Ave. E.

References

External links
City of Prince Albert website
École Vickers School
Community Profiles - Our Ten Neighbourhoods
St. Francis School

Neighbourhoods in Prince Albert, Saskatchewan